Brent Fultz is the Barbara and Stanley Rawn, Jr. Professor of Materials Science and Applied Physics at the California Institute of Technology. He is known for his research in materials physics and materials chemistry, and for establishing the importance of phonon entropy to the phase stability of materials. He oversaw the construction of the wide angular-range chopper spectrometer (ARCS) instrument at the Spallation Neutron Source and has made advances in phonon measuring techniques.

He is the author of two graduate level textbooks, Transmission Electron Microscopy and Diffractometry of Materials (with James M. Howe, Springer, 2001; 4th ed., 2013) on diffractometry of materials, and Phase Transitions in Materials (Cambridge University Press, 2014) on phase transitions in materials.

Awards
2010 TMS Electronic, Magnetic & Photonic Materials Division (EMPMD) Distinguished Scientist/Engineer Award
2016 TMS William Hume-Rothery Award
2016 Neutron Scattering Society of America Fellow
2017 American Physical Society Fellow
2018 TMS Fellow

References

External links
 Official site

Year of birth missing (living people)
Living people
Massachusetts Institute of Technology alumni
University of California, Berkeley alumni
California Institute of Technology faculty
American materials scientists
Fellows of the Minerals, Metals & Materials Society